Sino Plaza is a skyscraper located in the Causeway Bay district of Hong Kong. Completed in 1992, the building was designed by architectural firm Ho & Partners Architects, and developed by Sino Land Company Limited. Sino Plaza is the 85th-tallest building in Hong Kong, and is composed entirely of commercial office space.

In 2013, Sino Plaza was refurbished and a luxury retail shopping centre placed on the bottom floors. The redesign was by architectural firm, MAP Architecture & Planning, and was developed by Sino Land Company Limited.

See also
List of tallest buildings in Hong Kong

References

Skyscraper office buildings in Hong Kong
Office buildings completed in 1992
Causeway Bay
Shopping centres in Hong Kong